Mikhail Anatolyevich Vasilyev (born March 4, 1961, in Moscow) is a Russian former handball player who competed for the Soviet Union in the 1988 Summer Olympics.

In 1988 he won the gold medal with the Soviet team. He played all six matches and scored five goals.

External links
profile

1961 births
Living people
Soviet male handball players
Russian male handball players
Olympic handball players of the Soviet Union
Handball players at the 1988 Summer Olympics
Olympic gold medalists for the Soviet Union
Olympic medalists in handball
Sportspeople from Moscow
Medalists at the 1988 Summer Olympics